Kummen may refer to:

 Grete Kummen, a Norwegian cross-country skier
 Kummen (Ferden), an alpine settlement in the municipality of Ferden in the Swiss canton of Valais